"I'll Trade (A Million Bucks)" is the lead single by the R&B singer Keith Sweat featuring former label-mate Lil' Mo from Sweat's seventh album, Didn't See Me Coming (2000). The song was solely written by Mo and featured production by Sweat, Barry Salter and Jules Bartholomew. An autotuned remix produced by Walter "Mucho" Scott was released to vinyl pressings and appeared on Sweat's album as an interlude in the form of a snippet. A music video for the single was directed by J. Jesses Smith and premiered on BET in late September 2000.

In 2005, the song served as a sample for R&B singer Jhené Aiko's song, "Right Here," from the Disney Channel soundtrack, The Proud Family (2005).

Background
Sweat confirmed in an interview with Billboard that the concept behind the song was self-explanatory as given in the song's title. He further explained, "I'll trade whatever I have to have somebody who's down with me for me. That person doesn't have to have a million bucks. It pertains to anybody who has just a little something." In addition, Sweat was in talks to release an international remix featuring South African songstress Lebo Mathosa, however it was never released. At the time of its recording, the South African press revealed that Mathosa had recorded her vocals in a Johannesburg studio and sent it off to the US for final mixing.

Critical reception
The song met generally favorable reviews. Elysa Gardner from Vibe named the song a "slow-groove scorcher" and praised Lil' Mo for her capability in being a "sexy duet partner." Vinny Brown, PD of New York City's radio station WBLS-FM cited the single as being "classic Keith Sweat," and added: "Keith has proven to be a core artist... [and] continues to give the people what they want." AllMusic editor Ed Hogan nicknamed the track a "lonely superstar duet ballad."

Track listings and formats
Digital download
 "I'll Trade (A Million Bucks)" (Radio Edit) — 4:06

12" vinyl
 "I'll Trade (A Million Bucks)" (Remix)
 "I'll Trade (A Million Bucks)" (Remix Instrumental)
 "I'll Trade (A Million Bucks)" (Album Version)
 "I'll Trade (A Million Bucks)" (Instrumental)
 "I'll Trade (A Million Bucks)" (Acappella)

Charts
While the song went on to attain strong urban radio airplay (charting at #34 on Billboard Hot R&B/Hip-Hop Airplay), the song failed to make an entry on the Billboard Hot 100, making it Sweat's first lead single from an album to miss that chart.

References

2000 singles
2000 songs
Keith Sweat songs
Lil' Mo songs
Songs written by Lil' Mo
Elektra Records singles